This is a list of , who are glamour models in Japan that are generally more provocative than regular models and idols, though not to the point of posing nude.

21st century

A
 Yuzuki Aikawa (b. 1983)
 Rina Akiyama (b. 1985)
 Sayaka Ando (b. 1981)
 Hikaru Aoyama (b. 1993)
 Yui Aragaki (b. 1988) - later became an actress.
 Haruka Ayase (b. 1985) - later became an actress.

C
 Rola Chen (b. 1987) - from China

D
 Leah Dizon (b. 1986) - non-Japanese, American-born.

E
 Enako (b. 1994)

F
 Ena Fujita (b. 1990) - also a musician
 Kyoko Fukada (b. 1982) - also an actress
 Mina Fukui (b. 1984)

H
 Shōko Hamada
 Mikie Hara (b. 1987)
 Ourei Harada (b. 1986)
 Marica Hase (b. 1981)
 Yuka Hirata (b. 1983) - later became an actress.
 Saori Horii (b. 1984)
 Aki Hoshino (b. 1977)

I
 Miri Ichika (b. 1999)
 Yui Ichikawa (b. 1986) - later became an actress.
 Waka Inoue (b. 1980)
 Saaya Irie (b.1993, alias: Saaya)
 Miku Ishida (b. 1988)

K
 Reon Kadena (b. 1986, alias: Minamo Kusano) - later become a nude model.
 Megumi Kagurazaka
 Yukie Kawamura (b. 1986)
 Kii Kitano (b. 1991) - later became an actress.
 Noriko Kijima (b. 1988)
 Hitomi Kitamura (b. 1985)
 Emi Kobayashi (b. 1983)
 Mao Kobayashi (b. 1992)
 Yumi Kobayashi (b. 1988)
 Michiko Koga (b. 1986) - later became a musician
 Eiko Koike (b. 1980)
 Ayaka Komatsu (b. 1986)
 Yuka Kosaka (b. 1985)
 Asaka Kubo (b. 1979)
 Risa Kudo (b. 1983)
 Yoko Kumada (b. 1982)
 Chiaki Kyan (b. 1986)
 Kana Tsugihara (b. 1986)

M
 Yoko Matsugane (b. 1982)
 Hatsune Matsushima
 Mami Matsuyama (b. 1988)
 Megumi (b. 1981)
 Mikuru (b. 1988)
 Yoko Mitsuya (b. 1984)

N
 Shoko Nakagawa (b. 1985)
 Yukie Nakama (b. 1979)
 Kasumi Nakane (b. 1982)
 Jun Natsukawa (b. 1980)
 Rio Natsume (b. 1985)
 Harumi Nemoto (b. 1980)

O
 Yuko Ogura (b. 1983)
 Mariko Okubo
 Miwa Oshiro (b. 1983)
 Aiko Otake (b. 1994)
 Nana Ozaki (b. 1982, alias: Akiko Aimoto)
 Anri Okita (b. 1986)

P
 Phongchi (b. 1990) - Vietnamese descent

S
 Natsume Sano (b. 1985)
 Nozomi Sasaki (b. 1988)
 Erika Sawajiri (b. 1986)
 Ayaka Sayama (b. 1993)
 Risa Shimamoto (b. 1987)
 Ai Shinozaki (b. 1992)
 Yukina Shirakawa (b. 1985)
 Yuriko Shiratori (b. 1983)
 Anri Sugihara (b. 1982)
 Yumi Sugimoto (b. 1989)
 Fumika Suzuki (b. 1974)

T
 Chiaki Takahashi (b. 1977) - later became a voice actress
 Nozomi Takeuchi (b. 1980)
 Nonami Takizawa (b. 1985)
 Rio Teramoto (b. 2001) - also an actress
 Erika Toda (b. 1988) - later became an actress.
 Azusa Togashi (b. 1990)
 Ami Tokito (b. 1987)
 Kana Tsugihara

U
 Rio Uchida
 Miyu Uehara (1987–2011)
 Takako Uehara

Y
 Haruna Yabuki
 Erina Yamaguchi (b. 1985)
 Erika Yamakawa (b. 1982)
 Azusa Yamamoto (b. 1981)
 Saori Yamamoto (b. 1985)
 Mami Yamasaki (b. 1985)
 Minase Yashiro (b. 1985)
 Yinling (Yínlíng Yán, b.1978) - Taiwanese chakuero model.
 Sarii Yoshizawa (b. 1985) - Chakuero model
 Risa Yoshiki
 Ryoka Yuzuki (b. 1974) - later became a voice actress

20th century
 Yuko Aoki - 1990s
 Fumie Hosokawa - 1990s
 Agnes Lum - 1970s; Chinese-Hawaiian

References

See also
List of Japanese idols
Bakunyū

Japanese gravure idols
Gravure idols
 
Japanese gravure idols
Japanese gravure idols